Gibraltar Constitution Order may refer to:

Gibraltar Constitution Order 1969
Gibraltar Constitution Order 2006